Cross Point is the sixth album and the fifth studio album by Casiopea recorded and released in 1981.

Track listing

Personnel 
CASIOPEA are
Issei Noro - Electric guitar  (YAMAHA SG-2000 & SG-1000 Fretless, KORG Guitar Synthesizer, Lynn Drum Computer), Arrangement
Minoru Mukaiya - keyboards (Fender Rhodes, YAMAHA CP-80, GS-1, CS-30, KORG 800DV, Trident, Mini Moog, Prophet 10, Roland Jupiter-8, Acoustic Piano)
Tetsuo Sakurai - Bass (YAMAHA BB-2000)
Akira Jimbo - drums (YAMAHA YD-9000R), Percussion

 Eiji Urata - Synthesizer programming

Production 
 Producer - Shunsuke Miyazumi
 Co-Producer - Harvey Mason
 Associate producer - Satoshi Nakao
 Executive producer - Shoro Kawazoe
 Engineers - Norio Yoshizawa
 Assistant Engineers - Atsushi Saito
 Art Direction - Tsuguya Inoue
 Designer - Tsuguya Inoue
 Illustrator - Thomas Bayrle / UNAC TOKYO ⓒ1981
 Coordination - Toshinao Tsukui
Remastering engineer - Kouji Suzuki (2016)

Release history

External links 
 
 
 Thomas Bayrle's art

References 

1981 albums
Casiopea albums
Alfa Records albums